Param Vishisht Seva Medal (PVSM) is a military award of India. It was constituted in 1960 and since then it is awarded in recognition to peace-time service of the most exceptional order and may be awarded posthumously. All ranks of the Indian Armed Forces including Territorial Army, Auxiliary and Reserve Forces, Nursing officers and other members of the Nursing services and other lawfully constituted Armed Forces are eligible for the award.

History
The Param Vishisht Seva Medal was originally instituted as the "Vishisht Seva Medal, Class I" on 26 January 1960. Five other medals were instituted on the same day: the Sainya Seva Medal, Sena Medal, Nao Sena Medal and the Vayu Sena Medal. It was renamed on January 27, 1961, and the badge signed.

Design 
The medal is round in shape, 35 mm in diameter and fitted to a plain horizontal bar with standard fitting. It is made of gold gilt. On its obverse is embossed a five-pointed star and on its reverse is the Indian state emblem and the inscription embossed along the upper rim. The riband is of gold colour with one dark blue stripe down the centre dividing it into two equal parts. If a recipient of the medal is subsequently awarded the medal again, every such further award shall be recognized by a bar to be attached to the riband by which the medal is suspended. For every such bar, a miniature insignia of a pattern approved by the Government shall be added to the riband when worn alone.

See also
Sarvottam Yudh Seva Medal - the war-time equivalent

References

External links
 Vishist Seva Medal & Sarvottam Yudh Seva Medal at bharat-rakshak.com

Military awards and decorations of India